Tamizh Selvan is a 1996 Indian Tamil-language political drama film directed by Bharathiraja. The films stars Vijayakanth and Roja. It was released on 2 August 1996, and failed at the box office.

Plot 

Tamizh Selvan IAS starts as an assistant collector in Chennai. He is insulted by the corrupt collector because of his helpful and honest nature and skin color, but he does not give a budge and within a span becomes the chief collector in the city. He marries a research scholar Fathima and is assisted by Manuneethi Chozhan. A rebellious group leader initially opposes Tamizh Selvan since he had helped the police arrest one of their members. The group protests against the unfair and undue treatment of them in politician Vedimuthu's illegal quarry but since he hears their problems and solves it he is heralded as a hero by masses. This irks Vedimuthu and other politicians who do not want Tamizh Selvan to prosper. How Tamizh Selvan resists the politicians' attempts to damage his reputation forms the crux of the story.

Cast

Production 
R. Selvaraj wrote a story titled Vaakkapatta Bhoomi, with the intention of making it a film produced by himself, and Bharathiraja was assigned to direct, but the project did not materialise. Later, M. Ramanathan of Raaj Films International heard that Selvaraj had the call-sheets of Bharathiraja and Vijayakanth ready, and offered to produce any film with both involved. Bharathiraja and Vijayakanth agreed, and the film was Tamizh Selvan.

Soundtrack 
The music was composed by Deva, while the lyrics were written by Vaali and Vairamuthu.

Reception 
R. P. R. of Kalki praised Vijayakanth's performance, Bharathiraja's direction and Deva's background score. K. N. Vijiyan of New Straits Times wrote "Bharathirajaa takes the story along smoothly and maintains our interest until the end. But a few scenes were disjointed and I have a feeling this had something to do with our censors".

References

External links 
 

1990s political drama films
1990s Tamil-language films
1996 films
Films directed by Bharathiraja
Films scored by Deva (composer)
Indian political drama films